The Belle Shore Apartment Hotel is a building of the Bryn Mawr Historic District in the far-north community area of Edgewater in Chicago, Illinois. Located on West Bryn Mawr Avenue, it is across the road from the Bryn Mawr Apartment Hotel. It was declared a historic Chicago Landmark by the Chicago City Council.

External links
Chicago Landmark
Historic Images of Hotel
Edgewater Historical Society

Chicago Landmarks
Hotel buildings completed in 1929
Buildings and structures in Chicago
Apartment buildings in Chicago
Art Deco architecture in Illinois